Luciano da Silva or simply Triguinho (born 25 February 1979 in Piquete), is a Brazilian left back, who currently plays for Red Bull Brasil.

Career

Starting his career at Guaratinguetá, Triguinho had a brief spell at Barcelona B in 2001, returning to Brazil in the following year after his contract had expired.

He signed a new 3 years contract with São Caetano in January 2007, but he left for Anderlecht on 6-month loan deal on 16 May 2007.

In January 2008, he signed a one-year loan deal with Botafogo. On 8 February 2010 Coritiba signed the left-back on loan from São Caetano until the end of the season.

Honours
Figueirense
Campeonato Catarinense: 2002, 2003

Coritiba
Campeonato Brasileiro Série B: 2010
Campeonato Paranaense: 2010, 2011

Atlético Mineiro
Campeonato Mineiro: 2012

Contract
Botafogo (Loan) 2 January 2008 to 31 December 2008
São Caetano 1 January 2007 to 31 December 2009

External links
 sambafoot.com
 CBF

References

1979 births
Living people
Footballers from São Paulo (state)
Brazilian footballers
Association football fullbacks
Guaratinguetá Futebol players
FC Barcelona Atlètic players
Figueirense FC players
Associação Desportiva São Caetano players
R.S.C. Anderlecht players
Botafogo de Futebol e Regatas players
Santos FC players
Coritiba Foot Ball Club players
Clube Atlético Mineiro players
Red Bull Brasil players
Expatriate footballers in Belgium
Expatriate footballers in Spain
Campeonato Brasileiro Série A players